Parkway Properties, Inc. was a real estate investment trust that invested in office buildings in the Sun Belt. In 2016, the company was acquired by Cousins Properties.

Notable properties owned by the company included Liberty Place, Phoenix Tower, San Felipe Plaza in Houston Raymond James Tower in Memphis, Tennessee and The Murano in Philadelphia.

The company was formed on May 17, 1996.

In 2011, the company acquired the property management business of Eola Capital and its ownership stake in 6 properties for $462 million.

In 2012, the company acquired Hearst Tower for $250 million. The company also sold 15  properties in Memphis for $147.5 million.

References

1996 establishments in Florida
Financial services companies established in 1996
Financial services companies disestablished in 2016
Defunct real estate companies of the United States